In linguistics, a consonant cluster, consonant sequence or consonant compound, is a group of consonants which have no intervening vowel. In the education field it is variously called a consonant cluster or a consonant blend.

Some linguists argue that the term can be properly applied only to those consonant clusters that occur within one syllable. Others claim that the concept is more useful when it includes consonant sequences across syllable boundaries.

Phonotactics 

Each language has an associated set of  phonotactic constraints. Languages' phonotactics differ as to what consonant clusters they permit. Many languages are more restrictive than English in terms of consonant clusters, and some forbid consonant clusters entirely.

For example, Hawaiian, like most Malayo-Polynesian languages, forbid consonant clusters entirely.

Standard Arabic forbids initial consonant clusters and more than two consecutive consonants in other positions, as do most other Semitic languages, although Modern Israeli Hebrew permits initial two-consonant clusters (e.g.  "cap";  "pumpkin"), and Moroccan Arabic, under Berber influence, allows strings of several consonants. 

Like most Mon–Khmer languages, Khmer permits only initial consonant clusters with up to three consonants in a row per syllable. Finnish has initial consonant clusters natively only on South-Western dialects and on foreign loans, and only clusters of three inside the word are allowed. Most spoken languages and dialects, however, are more permissive. In Burmese, consonant clusters of only up to three consonants (the initial and two medials—two written forms of) at the initial onset are allowed in writing and only two (the initial and one medial) are pronounced; these clusters are restricted to certain letters. Some Burmese dialects allow for clusters of up to four consonants (with the addition of the  medial, which can combine with the above-mentioned medials).

At the other end of the scale, the Kartvelian languages of Georgia are drastically more permissive of consonant clustering. Consonants cannot appear as syllable nuclei in Georgian, so this syllable is analysed as CCCCCCCCVC. However, the liquid consonants  and  can form syllable nuclei in West and South Slavic languages and behave phonologically as vowels in this case.

An example of a true initial cluster is the Polish word  ( ("you will initiate"). In Dutch, clusters of six or even seven consonants are possible (e.g.

Some Salishan languages exhibit long words with no vowels at all, such as the Nuxálk word : he had had in his possession a bunchberry plant. It is extremely difficult to accurately classify which of these consonants may be acting as the syllable nucleus, and these languages challenge classical notions of exactly what constitutes a syllable. The same problem is encountered in the Northern Berber languages.

There has been a trend to reduce and simplify consonant clusters in East Asian languages, such as Chinese and Vietnamese. The word , read  in Mandarin and in Cantonese, is reconstructed as *klong or *krung in Old Chinese by Sinologists like Zhengzhang Shangfang, William H. Baxter, and Laurent Sagart. Additionally, initial clusters such as "tk" and "sn" were analysed in recent reconstructions of Old Chinese, and some were developed as palatalised sibilants.

Another element of consonant clusters in Old Chinese was analysed in coda and post-coda position. Some "departing tone" syllables have cognates in the "entering tone" syllables, which feature a -p, -t, -k in Middle Chinese and Southern Chinese varieties. The departing tone was analysed to feature a post-coda sibilant, "s". Clusters of -ps, -ts, -ks, were then formed at the end of syllables. These clusters eventually collapsed into "-ts" or "-s", before disappearing altogether, leaving elements of diphthongisation in more modern varieties. Old Vietnamese also had a rich inventory of initial clusters, but these were slowly merged with plain initials during Middle Vietnamese, and some have developed into the palatal nasal.

Origin 
Some consonant clusters originate from the loss of a vowel in between two consonants, usually (but not always) due to vowel reduction caused by lack of stress.  This is also the origin of most consonant clusters in English, some of which go back to Proto-Indo-European times, e.g. glow from Proto-germanic *glo-, from Proto-Indo-European *gʰel-ó, where *gʰel- is a root meaning to shine, to be bright (also present in glee, gleam, glade, etc.).

Consonant clusters can also originate from assimilation of a consonant with a vowel. In many Slavic languages, the combination mi- and me- regularly gave mli- and mle-. Compare Russian zemlyá with Polish ziemia, both from Proto-Balto-Slavic *źemē.

Loanwords 
Consonant clusters occurring in loanwords do not necessarily follow the cluster limits set by the borrowing language's phonotactics. These limits are called restraints or constraints (see also optimality theory). A loanword from Adyghe in the extinct Ubykh language,  ('to well up'), violates Ubykh's limit of two initial consonants. Also, the English words sphere  and sphinx , Greek loanwords, violate the rule that two fricatives may not appear adjacently word-initially.

English 
Final clusters of four consonants, as in angsts and twelfths in other dialects, sixths , bursts  (in rhotic accents) and glimpsed , are more common. Within compound words, clusters of five consonants or more are possible (if cross-syllabic clusters are accepted), as in handspring  and in the Yorkshire place-name of Hampsthwaite .

It is important to distinguish clusters and digraphs. Clusters are made of two or more consonant sounds, while a digraph is a group of two consonant letters standing for a single sound. For example, in the word ship, the two letters of the digraph  together represent the single consonant . It is worth noting that  often produces sounds in two different syllables (following the general principle of saturating the subsequent syllable before assigning sounds to the preceding syllable). Also note a combination digraph and cluster as seen in length with two digraphs ,  representing a cluster of two consonants:  (although it may be pronounced  instead, as  followed by a voiceless consonant in the same syllable often does); lights with a silent digraph  followed by a cluster , : ; and compound words such as sightscreen  or catchphrase .

Korean 
In Modern Hangul (Korean alphabet) there are 11 consonant-clusters: ㄳ, ㄵ, ㄶ, ㄺ, ㄻ, ㄼ, ㄽ, ㄾ, ㄿ, ㅀ, ㅄ. These come as the final consonant in a syllabic block and refer to consonant letters, not consonant sounds. They instead influence the consonant of the next syllable. However, Middle Korean did have consonant clusters, as evidenced by double consonant clusters in initial position (e.g. ᄓ and ㅯ) as well as triple consonants in both positions (e.g. ㅫ and ᇒ).

Frequency
Not all consonant clusters are distributed equally among the languages of the world. Consonant clusters have a tendency to fall under patterns such as the sonority sequencing principle (SSP); the closer a consonant in a cluster is to the syllable's vowel, the more sonorous the consonant is. Among the most common types of clusters are initial stop-liquid sequences, such as in Thai (e.g. Other common ones include initial stop-approximant (e.g. Thai ) and initial fricative-liquid (e.g. English ) sequences. Certain consonants are more or less likely to appear in consonant clusters, especially in certain positions.

Consonant clusters at the ends of syllables are less common but follow the same principles. Clusters are more likely to begin with a liquid, approximant, or nasal and end with a fricative, affricate, or stop, such as in English "world" . Yet again, there are exceptions, such as English "lapse" .

See also 
 English consonant cluster reductions
 Vowel cluster
 Conjunct consonant
 Consonant stacking

Notes

References 

Phonotactics
Phonetics
Phonology